Eupalinos or Eupalinus of Megara was an ancient Greek engineer who built the Tunnel of Eupalinos on Samos Island in the 6th century BC.

The tunnel, presumably completed between 550 and 530 BC, is the second known tunnel in history which was excavated from both ends and the first with a methodical approach in doing so. Being also the longest tunnel of its time, the Tunnel of Eupalinos is regarded as a major feat of ancient engineering. It brought water to the city, passing through limestone at the base of a hill; this tunnel still exists.

The Greek historian Herodotus describes the tunnel briefly in his Histories (3.60) and calls Eupalinos of Megara its architect:

Eupalinos is considered the first hydraulic engineer in history whose name has been passed down. Apart from that, though, nothing more is known about him.

A large road tunnel, named after Eupalinos has been recently built under the Geraneia mountains in Corinthia, to facilitate the new expressway connection between Athens and Corinth. Eupalinos tunnel is the longest of three subsequent tunnels of the same width at this expressway.

See also 
 Ancient Greek units of measurement

References

Further reading

External links 
 
 Dan Hughes: The Tunnel of Eupalinos
 Tom M. Apostol: The Tunnel of Samos (HTML)
 The Eupalinian aqueduct by the Greek Ministry of Culture


6th-century BC Greek people
Ancient Greek architects
Ancient Greek engineers
Ancient Megarians
Year of birth unknown
Year of death unknown